Parrot training, also called parrot teaching, is the application of training techniques to modify the behavior of household companion parrots. Training is used to deal with behavior problems such as biting and screaming, to train husbandry behaviors such as allowing claw trimming without restraint or accepting a parrot harness, and to teach various tricks.

Parrot psychology
Although very trainable and intelligent, parrots are a prey species and are naturally more cautious than predatory species such as dogs.  They often must be trained more slowly and carefully.  Parrots can, however, eventually be taught many complicated tricks and behaviors, and remember them for years.  Parrots are often used in shows at zoos and amusement parks.

Parrots need to socialize. Some behavior problems may be averted through parrot training. As with any animal, training birds also requires patience, time, and commitment with several short sessions each day.

Taming
Parrot taming, or teaching, can be measured by the number, or types of behaviors it knows. Teaching can be achieved through the science behind operant or classical conditioning and is what is currently accepted by the major AZA accredited zoos and aquariums in the US. If a parrot is exposed to an unusual or mildly aversive stimulus on purpose, such as a new toy or a hand it can create a fear response very easily in a prey animal such as a bird. Training is at a comfortable pace so the bird accepts the object via small approximations in behavior. Teaching any animal this way prevents flooding and initiation of its fight or flight response.

Common tricks
Tricks commonly taught to pet parrots may include targeting, approaching on command, retrieve, shaking "claws", opening wings, bowing, riding bicycles, flying through hoops, flying free outdoors, talking and singing on command, and roller skating.

Flight tricks
A wide assortment of tricks can be taught which incorporate flight. Recall flight, targeted flight, and the flighted retrieve trick, where the parrot flies to retrieve an object and bring it back. A parrot can fly to retrieve a coin and fly to a different location to drop it in a piggy bank or it can fly to pick up a ball and fly up to a basketball hoop and drop it in.

Flight training a bird to be a reliable flyer requires expertise on the trainer's part. If the trainer is not dedicated to both positive reinforcement and negative punishment training, then problems will occur in the training. Birds may learn to fly away from the owner or new objects as a result of flooding. Trainers who do not rely exclusively on positive reinforcement and negative reinforcement training will often use harnesses on their birds because of the poor training techniques they apply such as; grabbing the bird when it does not want to train, snatching the bird out of flight, launching the bird off the hand, and dropping the hand to make a bird fly, all of which increase the fear response in a bird. Harnesses can be a great tool when used properly as a rarely used backup plan to keep the bird safe. But if the trainer heavily relies on a harness to keep the bird safe, then it is an obvious sign that the training methods used where not positive reinforcement and negative punishment. Trainers who use the harness too much often have problems controlling the bird in an outdoor environment and have problems with birds flying off and not coming back. This problem can be remedied by refining the person's training skills and by eliminating negative reinforcement and positive punishment from the training routine.

Punishment and negative reinforcement

It is not suggested to use positive punishment or negative reinforcement when training, such as spraying a parrot with water or flick its beak as a way to modify behavior. Such techniques are more likely to cause escape, avoidance, aggression, apathy, generalized fear of the environment, or generalized reduction in behavior, and are not considered good training methods.

Negative reinforcement is commonly used with parrots and involves removing something aversive from the environment that will increase behavior. For example, "A rat is placed in a cage and immediately receives a mild electrical shock on its feet. The shock is a negative condition for the rat. The rat presses a bar and the shock stops. The rat receives another shock, presses the bar again, and again the shock stops. The rat's behavior of pressing the bar is strengthened by the consequence of the stopping of the shock." the shock is removed (negative) to increase the behavior (reinforcement) of pressing the lever.

Both positive punishment and negative reinforcement are inherently linked producing similar intensities in undesirable consequences such as escape, avoidance, aggression, apathy, generalized fear of the environment, or generalized reduction in behavior. As in the example with the rat, the shock acts as a positive punisher while the removal of the shock acts as a negative reinforcer which is why the two contingencies are inherently linked. Negative reinforcement cannot be used unless an aversive (the shock) was already applied. Both are un-encouraged in common trick-training programs.

It has been said that three out of the four contingencies are labeled as aversives, excluding positive reinforcement. Depending on the contingency and the level of severity of the contingency used, side-effects will increase with application. To list the order of which the severity of side-effects intensifies: negative punishment, negative reinforcement, positive punishment. That is, when considering a training strategy to produce results with the least amount of aggression, apathy, escape/avoidance etc. the best choice is negative punishment while the worst is positive punishment.

As a rule it is easiest to identify a positive punisher and negative reinforcer by the response given by the subject.

Positive reinforcement
Positive training puts the owner in the position of leader. One's parrot will begin looking to him or her for cues on how to behave. By using positive reinforcement and keeping bird training sessions fun, the parrot will try to please its owner to get positive attention as a reward. According to Irene Pepperberg's avian research, pet birds have the intelligence of a three to five-year-old child. They require mental stimulation to remain emotionally healthy, and bird trick-training exercises a bird's brain. Training a parrot with positive reinforcement techniques uses rewards to strengthen or increase the frequency of a behavior.

An example of positive reinforcement training with a companion parrot is to take a parrot who is afraid of stepping up onto its owner's hand and rewarding it with a desired treat when it shows relaxed behavior next to the owner's hand.  The parrot would then be rewarded for allowing the hand to come closer, and would be rewarded for stepping up onto the hand.  Another example would be for a trainer to wait until a screaming parrot is quiet for a very short time, and then immediately reward it with praise and attention.  The owner would then gradually increase the amount of time the parrot must be quiet to receive the extra attention.

With this type of positive reinforcement approach to training (see shaping), the parrot is only rewarded for behaviors that bring it closer to the final desired outcome.  For this technique to work effectively, it is common to have to reward a parrot several times for making very small amounts of progress.

Training a parrot with this type of positive reinforcement is the least abrasive approach to training parrots, and often the most effective parrot training technique to use when a companion parrot owner desires to use a training technique that will develop a stronger emotional bond with their parrot.

Positive reinforcement is also very useful for trick training.  A desired trick behavior can be shaped gradually, rewarding a parrot for approximations to the desired behavior.  Trick training is generally considered to be positive for parrots.

In clicker training, a parrot is taught to associate a click with receiving a reward and is a particularly popular form of positive reinforcement training. In clicker training, the click noise can be used to mark the instant a parrot does the desired behavior, making for more efficient training.

Counter-conditioning
Counter-conditioning is the process of altering a parrot's behavior to a stimulus by altering the consequence from aversive to positive. If a parrot bites an approaching hand in self-defense, the biting behavior can be counter-conditioned by supplementing the approaching hand with positive reinforcement. Instead of biting, the parrot will learn to accept the approaching hand because it is coupled with positive reinforcement.

See also
Flooding
Clicker training
Positive reinforcement
Punishment

References

External sources
The Sequential Psittacine - website about parrots
Tinkerbell of Taiwan - Living with a flighted parrot at home and how to train and bond together
Understand the mind of your parrot and how to train and bond together
Parrot Behaviour Consultants - IAABC

Animal training
Aviculture